Lionel Murray, Baron Murray of Epping Forest,  (2 August 1922 – 20 May 2004) was a British Labour Party politician and trade union leader.

Early life
Murray was born in Hadley, Shropshire, the son of a young unmarried woman, Lorna Hodskinson, and was brought up by a local nurse, Mary Jane Chilton. He attended Wellington Grammar School, read English at Queen Mary College, London, and then joined the British Army.

Army
In the Second World War Murray was commissioned in the King's Shropshire Light Infantry in April 1943 and took part in the Normandy landings on D-Day. Six days later, Murray was badly wounded and in October 1944 was invalided out of the army with the rank of lieutenant.

Demobilisation
Murray worked at an engineering works in Wolverhampton as storekeeper, before leaving to sell The Daily Worker on street corners and joining the Communist Party. Whilst selling The Daily Worker, he encountered his former headmaster, who informed him he was wasting his time. Determined to improve himself, shortly afterwards Murray gained a place at New College, Oxford, where he graduated with a First in PPE after two years' study under tutors including the future MP Dick Crossman and Sir John Hicks.

Career
Murray started as a manager for a Liverpool catering firm. He was a Trades Union Congress (TUC) employee from 1947, when he joined as an assistant in the economics department. Seven years later he was promoted to head of the department. He was elected assistant general-secretary in 1969.

In 1970 he was invited to deliver the Marlow (Scotland) Lecture to the Institution of Engineers and Shipbuilders in Scotland. He chose the subject Trade Unions and the State – 1964 to 1970 in Retrospect.

He became General Secretary of the TUC in 1973, leading it during the Winter of Discontent and confrontations with Margaret Thatcher's government.

Personal life
Murray married Heather Woolf, a nurse, in 1945. The couple had two daughters and two sons, the younger of whom, David, pursued a successful career in the Royal Air Force. They lived in Loughton, Essex.

Murray served as a TUC officer until his retirement in 1984, three years early. Upon his retirement in early May 1984, he made the following statement – "There are places to go, books to read, flowers to smell and trees to look at. I would like to walk through Epping Forest".

He was active in Loughton Methodist Church. Murray died in hospital in 2004 from septicaemia and pneumonia.

Honours
Murray was appointed Officer of the Order of the British Empire (OBE) in the 1966 New Year Honours.

Sworn of the Privy Council in 1976, he was created a life peer as Baron Murray of Epping Forest, of Telford in the County of Shropshire, on 14 February 1985. The Murray Hall in Loughton was named after him, and a blue plaque to him was unveiled on the family house, 29 The Crescent, in January 2019.

References

External links
 News of Murray's death (The Guardian)
 Obituary of Len Murray (Daily Telegraph)

1922 births
2004 deaths
Alumni of New College, Oxford
British Army personnel of World War II
People from Telford
King's Shropshire Light Infantry officers
General Secretaries of the Trades Union Congress
Trade unionists from Shropshire
Labour Party (UK) life peers
Members of the Privy Council of the United Kingdom
Officers of the Order of the British Empire
Deaths from emphysema
Deaths from pneumonia in England
Methodist local preachers
Life peers created by Elizabeth II